Neomordellistena ivoirensis is a beetle in the genus Neomordellistena of the family Mordellidae. It was described in 1968 by Ermisch.

References

ivoirensis
Beetles described in 1968